Žďár (meaning slash-and-burn in Czech) may refer to places in the Czech Republic: 

Žďár (Blansko District), a municipality and village in the South Moravian Region
Žďár (Jindřichův Hradec District), a municipality and village in the South Bohemian Region
Žďár (Mladá Boleslav District), a municipality and village in the Central Bohemian Region
Žďár (Písek District), a municipality and village in the South Bohemian Region
Žďár (Rakovník District), a municipality and village in the Central Bohemian Region
Žďár, a village and part of Brzice in the Hradec Králové Region
Žďár, a village and part of Chodský Újezd in the Plzeň Region
Žďár, a village and part of Doksy in the Liberec Region
Žďár, a village and part of Kaplice in the South Bohemian Region
Žďár, a village and part of Levínská Olešnice in the Liberec Region
Žďár, a village and part of Nalžovské Hory in the Plzeň Region
Žďár, a village and part of Radíč in the Central Bohemian Region
Žďár, a village and part of Tanvald in the Liberec Region
Žďár, a village and part of Velké Chvojno in the Ústí nad Labem Region
Žďár, a village and part of Veselá (Semily District) in the Liberec Region
Žďár, a village and part of Ždírec (Plzeň-South District) in the Plzeň Region
Žďár nad Metují, a municipality and village in the Hradec Králové Region
Žďár nad Orlicí, a municipality and village in the Hradec Králové Region
Žďár nad Sázavou, a town in the Vysočina Region
Žďár u Kumburku, a village and part of Syřenov in the Central Bohemian Region
Dolní Žďár, a municipality and village in the South Bohemian Region
Pluhův Žďár, a municipality and village in the South Bohemian Region
Veselý Žďár, a municipality and village in the Vysočina Region

See also
Žďárec
Žďárek
Žďárky
Žďárná
Žďárské vrchy